The American Swiss Foundation is a private non-profit foreign policy organization headquartered in New York. It was founded in 1945 "to preserve and strengthen the historic friendship between the United States and Switzerland".

Conference
The main program of the American Swiss Foundation is a Young Leaders Conference, held annually in Switzerland since 1990. Conference alumni now number more than 1,300 leaders in both countries from business, government, the media, and academia.

References

External links
 

Switzerland–United States relations

 Post about ASF Alumni Event at U.S. Embassy Bern

 Article about ASF Chairman Robert Giuffra in Neue Zurcher Zeitung
 Op-ed by ASF President Patricia Schramm about U.S.-Swiss Trade in the Washington Times
 Article about ASF event with John Hennessy in Neue Zurcher Zeitung